The following is an overview of 1933 in film, including significant events, a list of films released, and notable births and deaths.

Top-grossing films (U.S.)
The top ten 1933 released films by box office gross in North America are as follows:

Events
The Film Daily Yearbook listed the following as the ten leading news events of the year in North America.
 Motion picture industry goes under National Recovery Administration code.
 Receivers appointed for Paramount Publix, RKO and Fox Theatres.
 Film industry takes eight week salary cut.
 Sirovich bill for sweeping probe of film industry is defeated.
 John D. Hertz withdraws as Paramount Publix finance chairman and Adolph Zukor appoints George J. Schaefer as general manager.
 Sidney Kent effects financial reorganization of Fox Film Corp., averting receivership, and company shows first profit since 1930.
 Ruling of the United States District Court for the District of Delaware creates "open market" for sound equipment.
 Nathan Nathanson regains control of Famous Players Canadian circuit.
 Darryl F. Zanuck quits Warner Bros-First National and with Joseph M. Schenck forms Twentieth Century Pictures, turning out eight productions in the first four months, beginning with The Bowery.
 Harold B. Franklin resigns as president of RKO Theaters.

Other notable events include:
 January 11 – Radio City Music Hall in New York City starts showing films.
 January 20 – The film Ecstasy premieres in Czechoslovakia film; its foreign distribution presents difficulties as 18-year-old actress Hedy Lamarr is seen naked in it.
 March – Director Fritz Lang is informed by Joseph Goebbels that release of Lang's crime-thriller The Testament of Dr. Mabuse in Germany will not be permitted by the newly formed Reich Ministry of Public Enlightenment and Propaganda. The German-language premiere takes place on April 21 in Budapest (Hungary). On April 20, Lang divorces his wife, the film's writer Thea von Harbou, and on July 31 leaves Germany permanently, initially settling in Paris.
 March 2 – King Kong premieres at Radio City Music Hall in New York City; opening weekend takings are estimated at US$90,000.
 March 9 – Punyal na Ginto (The Golden Dagger), the first Filipino-language film made in the Philippines, is released. 
 March 11 – 42nd Street sparks a comeback for musical film.
 June 6 – The drive-in theater is patented in Camden, New Jersey.
 September 6 – Daily Variety, a trade newspaper, is published for the first time in Hollywood.
 October 10 – John Wayne appears as Singin' Sandy Saunders in Riders of Destiny.
 December 29 – Fred Astaire and Ginger Rogers appear on screen together for the first time in Flying Down to Rio.
 Ang Aswang, the first sound film made in the Philippines, is released. 
 Makata At Paraluman (The Poet and the Maiden), the first talking film in vernacular made in the Philippines, is released. 
 British Film Institute founded.
 GPO Film Unit established in the United Kingdom under John Grierson, taking over responsibility for documentary film making from the Empire Marketing Board.
 Metro-Goldwyn-Mayer (MGM) once again expresses interest in The Wizard of Oz books for a series of animated shorts, but once again fail to make a deal with the estate of creator L. Frank Baum.
 The Private Life of Henry VIII becomes the first British film to win an American Academy Award. Featured actor Charles Laughton wins the 1933 Academy Award for Best Actor for his performance. The film is the first British production to be nominated for the Academy Award for Best Picture.
 The book Upton Sinclair Presents William Fox is published, detailing what William Fox considers to be the conspiracy that forced him from control of Fox Film in 1930.

Academy Awards

The 6th Academy Awards were held on March 16, 1934, at The Ambassador Hotel in Los Angeles. They were hosted by Will Rogers and Rogers also presented all of the awards. This was the last time that the Oscars' eligibility period was spread over two different calendar years, creating the longest time frame for which films could be nominated: the seventeen months from August 1, 1932, to December 31, 1933.

Most nominations: Cavalcade (Fox Film); A Farewell to Arms (Paramount Pictures) and Lady for a Day (Columbia Pictures) – 4

Major awards:
 Best Picture: Cavalcade – Fox Film
 Best Director: Frank Lloyd – Cavalcade
 Best Actor: Charles Laughton – The Private Life of Henry VIII
 Best Actress: Katharine Hepburn – Morning Glory

Most Awards: Cavalcade – 3 (Outstanding Production; Best Director; Best Art Direction)

1933 film releases
United States unless stated

January–March
January 1933
3 January
The Bitter Tea of General Yen
10 January
The Vampire Bat
12 January 
Laughter in Hell
13 January
The Monkey's Paw
20 January
Ecstasy (Czechoslovakia)
21 January
Tonight Is Ours
27 January
She Done Him Wrong
28 January
Hard to Handle
Parachute Jumper
February 1933
3 February
Hallelujah, I'm a Bum
4 February
Ladies They Talk About
10 February
State Fair
What! No Beer?
17 February
Men Must Fight
18 February
Mystery of the Wax Museum
22 February
The House of Dora Green (Germany)
23 February
Our Betters
24 February
Perfect Understanding (GB)
Topaze
28 February
The Good Companions
Oliver Twist
March 1933
2 March
King Kong
10 March
Fast Workers
King of the Jungle
Liebelei (Germany)
11 March
42nd Street
15 March
In the Wake of the Bounty (Australia)
21 March
The Flower of Hawaii (Die Blume von Hawaii)
24 March
Pick-Up
25 March
Okraina (The Outskirts) (U.S.S.R.)
31 March
Gabriel Over the White House

April–June
April 1933
7 April
Zero for Conduct (Zéro de conduite) (France)
14 April
Today We Live
15 April
Cavalcade
20 April
The Working Man
21 April
Supernatural
22 April
A Bedtime Story
27 April
Dragnet Girl (Hijosen no onna)
28 April
Looking Forward
May 1933
5 May
The Devil's Brother
6 May
The Eagle and the Hawk
Picture Snatcher
12 May
The Story of Temple Drake
14 May
A Study in Scarlet
15 May
Ex-Lady
19 May
Adorable
25 May
Don Quixote
26 May
Peg o' My Heart
27 May
Gold Diggers of 1933
International House
29 May
Ganga Bruta (Brazil)
June 1933
9 June
Professional Sweetheart
23 June
The Mayor of Hell
When Ladies Meet
30 June
Hold Your Man
Midnight Mary

July–September
July 1933
1 July
Baby Face
3 July
Loyalties
8 July
It's Great to Be Alive
14 July
Bed of Roses
Storm at Daybreak
15 July
She Done Him Wrong
17 June
Heroes for Sale
20 July
Secret of the Blue Room
28 July
The Stranger's Return
29 July
Midnight Club
August 1933
1 August
Employees' Entrance
5 August
Voltaire
8 August
Three-Cornered Moon
13 August
Deluge
16 August
The Power and the Glory
17 August
The Private Life of Henry VIII
18 August
Morning Glory
Pilgrimage
25 August
This Day and Age
Turn Back the Clock
29 August
Dinner at Eight
30 August
S.O.S Iceberg (S.O.S. Eisberg) (Germany)
31 August
Bitter Sweet (GB)
September 1933
1 September
Beauty for Sale
One Sunday Afternoon
7 September
Passing Fancy (Dekigokoro) (Japan)
8 September
Penthouse
Torch Singer
13 September
Lady for a Day
15 September
Berkeley Square
16 September
Bureau of Missing Persons
20 September
Footlight Parade
22 September
Doctor Bull
23 September
I Loved a Woman
26 September
Ann Vickers
29 September
The Emperor Jones

October–December
October 1933
6 October
I'm No Angel
7 October
The Bowery
Wild Boys of the Road
13 October
Bombshell
Tillie and Gus
26 October
After Tonight
27 October
Man's Castle
28 October
Ever in My Heart
November 1933
1 November
Only Yesterday
10 November
The Prizefighter and the Lady
13 November
The Invisible Man
16 November
Little Women
17 November
Blood Money
Duck Soup
November 20
The Wandering Jew 
24 November
Dancing Lady
25 November
The World Changes
December 1933
3 December
Lady Killer
11 December
Counsellor at Law
14 December
Convention City
18 December
By Candlelight
22 December
Alice in Wonderland
Going Hollywood
Mr. Skitch
The Son of Kong
23 December
The House on 56th Street
Viktor und Viktoria (Germany)
25 December
Roman Scandals
26 December
Queen Christina
29 December
Design for Living
Flying Down to Rio
Sons of the Desert

Notable films released in 1933
United States unless stated

0-9
42nd Street, directed by Lloyd Bacon, starring Warner Baxter, Bebe Daniels, George Brent, Una Merkel and Dick Powell

A
Adorable, directed by William Dieterle, starring Janet Gaynor
After Tonight, directed by George Archainbaud, starring Constance Bennett and Gilbert Roland
Alice in Wonderland, directed by Norman Z. McLeod, starring Charlotte Henry, Richard Arlen, Gary Cooper, W. C. Fields, Cary Grant and Jack Oakie
Ann Vickers, directed by John Cromwell, starring Irene Dunne and Walter Huston

B
Baby Face, directed by Alfred E. Green, starring Barbara Stanwyck and George Brent
Beauty for Sale, directed by Richard Boleslawski, starring Madge Evans, Alice Brady and Una Merkel
Bed of Roses, directed by Gregory La Cava, starring Constance Bennett and Joel McCrea
A Bedtime Story, directed by Norman Taurog, starring Maurice Chevalier and Helen Twelvetrees
Berkeley Square, directed by Frank Lloyd, starring Leslie Howard
Bitter Sweet, directed by Herbert Wilcox, starring Anna Neagle – (GB)
The Bitter Tea of General Yen, directed by Frank Capra, starring Barbara Stanwyck and Nils Asther
Blood Money, directed by Rowland Brown, starring George Bancroft
Bombshell, directed by Victor Fleming, starring Jean Harlow, Lee Tracy, Frank Morgan, Franchot Tone, Pat O'Brien and Una Merkel
The Bowery, directed by Raoul Walsh, starring Wallace Beery, George Raft, Jackie Cooper and Fay Wray
Bureau of Missing Persons, directed by Roy Del Ruth, starring Bette Davis, Lewis Stone, Pat O'Brien and Glenda Farrell
By Candlelight, directed by James Whale

C
Cash, directed by Zoltan Korda, starring Robert Donat – (GB)
Cavalcade, directed by Frank Lloyd, starring Diana Wynyard and Clive Brook
Convention City (lost), directed by Archie Mayo, starring Joan Blondell, Adolphe Menjou, Dick Powell and Mary Astor
Counsellor at Law, directed by William Wyler, starring John Barrymore and Bebe Daniels

D
Dancing Lady, directed by Robert Z. Leonard, starring Joan Crawford, Clark Gable and Franchot Tone
Daybreak (Tiānmíng), directed by Sun Yu – (China)
Deluge, directed by Felix E. Feist, starring Sidney Blackmer
The Deserter (Dezertir), directed by Vsevolod Pudovkin – (U.S.S.R.)
Design for Living, directed by Ernst Lubitsch, starring Fredric March, Gary Cooper and Miriam Hopkins
The Devil's Brother, directed by Hal Roach, starring Laurel and Hardy
Dick Turpin, directed by Victor Hanbury, starring Victor McLaglen – (GB)
Dinner at Eight, directed by George Cukor, starring Marie Dressler, John Barrymore, Wallace Beery, Jean Harlow, Lionel Barrymore, Lee Tracy and Billie Burke
Doctor Bull, directed by John Ford, starring Will Rogers
Don Quixote, directed by G.W. Pabst, starring Feodor Chaliapin – (France/GB)
Dora's Dunking Doughnuts, directed by Harry Edwards, starring Shirley Temple
Dragnet Girl (Hijōsen no Onna), directed by Yasujirō Ozu, starring Kinuyo Tanaka – (Japan)
Duck Soup, directed by Leo McCarey, starring the Marx Brothers

E
The Eagle and the Hawk, directed by Stuart Walker, starring Fredric March, Cary Grant, Carole Lombard and Jack Oakie
Ecstasy (Extase), directed by Gustav Machatý, starring Hedy Lamarr – (Czechoslovakia)
The Emperor Jones, starring Paul Robeson
Employees' Entrance, starring Warren William and Loretta Young
Ever in My Heart, starring Barbara Stanwyck
Ex-Lady, starring Bette Davis

F
Fast Workers, starring John Gilbert and Mae Clarke
The Flower of Hawaii (Die Blume von Hawaii), directed by Richard Oswald – (Germany)
Flying Down to Rio, starring Dolores del Río and Gene Raymond. Also starring Fred Astaire and Ginger Rogers in their first of 10 films together
Footlight Parade, starring James Cagney, Joan Blondell and Ruby Keeler
Friday the Thirteenth, directed by Victor Saville, starring Jessie Matthews – (GB)

G
Gabriel Over the White House, directed by Gregory La Cava, starring Walter Huston, Produced by William Randolph Hearst
Ganga Bruta, directed by Humberto Mauro, starring Durval Bellini and Déa Selva (Brazil)
The Ghoul, starring Boris Karloff, Cedric Hardwicke and Ernest Thesiger – (GB)
The Ghost Camera, directed by Bernard Vorhaus, starring Ida Lupino, John Mills – (GB)
Going Hollywood, starring Marion Davies, Bing Crosby, Patsy Kelly, Fifi D'Orsay and Sterling Holloway
Gold Diggers of 1933, directed by Mervyn LeRoy, starring Joan Blondell, Ruby Keeler, Dick Powell, Ginger Rogers and Warren William
The Good Companions, directed by Victor Saville, starring Jessie Matthews, Edmund Gwenn and John Gielgud – (GB)
Goodbye Again, starring Joan Blondell and Warren William

H
Hallelujah, I'm a Bum, starring Al Jolson
Hard to Handle, starring James Cagney
Heroes for Sale, starring Loretta Young and Richard Barthelmess
Hold Your Man, starring Jean Harlow and Clark Gable
The House on 56th Street, starring Kay Francis
The House of Dora Green, directed by Henrik Galeen, starring Mady Christians – (Germany)
The Hymn of Leuthen, directed by Carl Froelich – (Germany)

I
I Loved a Woman (1933), starring Edward G. Robinson and Kay Francis
I'm No Angel, starring Mae West and Cary Grant. West also wrote the story and screenplay.
In the Wake of the Bounty, starring Errol Flynn as Fletcher Christian – (Australia)
International House, starring W. C. Fields, George Burns, Gracie Allen
The Invisible Man, starring Claude Rains in the title role with Gloria Stuart
It's Great to Be Alive, directed by Alfred L. Werker and starring Raul Roulien and Gloria Stuart

K
Każdemu wolno kochać (Anybody Can Love), by Mieczysław Krawicz – (Poland)
The Keyhole, starring Kay Francis and George Brent, directed by Michael Curtiz
King Kong, starring Fay Wray and Robert Armstrong
King of the Jungle, starring Buster Crabbe

L
Ladies They Talk About, starring Barbara Stanwyck
Lady for a Day, directed by Frank Capra, starring Warren William and May Robson
Lady Killer, starring James Cagney
Liebelei, directed by Max Ophüls – (Germany)
Life Is a Dog (Život je pes), directed by Martin Frič – (Czechoslovakia)
Little Toys (Xiáo wǎnyì), directed by Sun Yu – (China)
Little Women, directed by George Cukor, starring Katharine Hepburn and Joan Bennett
Looking Forward, directed by Clarence Brown, starring Lionel Barrymore
Lot in Sodom, starring Friedrich Haak
Loyalties, starring Basil Rathbone – (GB)

M
Man's Castle, starring Spencer Tracy and Loretta Young
The Mayor of Hell, starring James Cagney
Men Must Fight, starring Diana Wynyard
Midnight Club, starring George Raft and Clive Brook
Midnight Mary, directed by William A. Wellman, starring Loretta Young
The Midnight Patrol, starring Stan Laurel and Oliver Hardy
Money for Speed, directed by Bernard Vorhaus, starring John Loder and Ida Lupino – (GB)
The Monkey's Paw, directed by Ernest B. Schoedsack
Morning Glory, starring Katharine Hepburn and Douglas Fairbanks Jr.
Mr. Skitch, starring Will Rogers
Mystery of the Wax Museum, starring Lionel Atwill and Fay Wray

O
Okraina (The Outskirts) – (U.S.S.R.)
Oliver Twist, starring Dickie Moore 
One Sunday Afternoon, starring Gary Cooper and Fay Wray
Only Yesterday, starring Margaret Sullavan
Our Betters, starring Constance Bennett, Gilbert Roland and Anita Louise

P
Parachute Jumper, starring Douglas Fairbanks Jr., Bette Davis and Frank McHugh
Passing Fancy (Dekigokoro), directed by Yasujirō Ozu – (Japan)
Peg o' My Heart, starring Marion Davies, Onslow Stevens and J. Farrell MacDonald
Penthouse, starring Warner Baxter and Myrna Loy
Perfect Understanding, starring Gloria Swanson and Laurence Olivier – (GB)
Pick-Up, starring Sylvia Sidney and George Raft
Picture Snatcher, starring James Cagney
Pilgrimage, directed by John Ford
The Power and the Glory, starring Spencer Tracy
The Private Life of Henry VIII, directed by Alexander Korda, starring Charles Laughton – (GB)
The Prizefighter and the Lady, starring Max Baer, Myrna Loy, Primo Carnera and Jack Dempsey
Professional Sweetheart, starring Ginger Rogers

Q-R
Queen Christina, directed by Rouben Mamoulian, starring Greta Garbo and John Gilbert
Refugees – (Germany)
Roman Scandals, starring Eddie Cantor, Ruth Etting, Gloria Stuart

S
S.O.S Iceberg (S.O.S. Eisberg), starring Leni Riefenstahl – (Germany)
Secret of the Blue Room, starring Paul Lukas, Gloria Stuart and Lionel Atwill
Secrets, starring Mary Pickford in her last film
She Done Him Wrong, starring Mae West and Cary Grant in his first notable film role
She Had to Say Yes, starring Loretta Young and Lyle Talbot, directed by Busby Berkeley and George Amy
The Son of Kong, starring Robert Armstrong and Helen Mack
Sons of the Desert, starring Stan Laurel and Oliver Hardy
A Southern Maid, starring Bebe Daniels and Clifford Mollison – (GB)
Spring Silkworms (Chung Can) – (China)
State Fair, starring Janet Gaynor, Will Rogers and Lew Ayres
Storm at Daybreak, starring Walter Huston and Kay Francis
The Story of Temple Drake, starring Miriam Hopkins and Jack La Rue
The Stranger's Return, starring Miriam Hopkins and Lionel Barrymore
A Study in Scarlet, Sherlock Holmes film written by Robert Florey, directed by Edwin Marin, starring Reginald Owen as Holmes and Warburton Gamble as Watson
Supernatural, starring Carole Lombard, Alan Dinehart, Vivienne Osborne and Randolph Scott

T
The Testament of Dr. Mabuse, directed by Fritz Lang, starring Otto Wernicke – (Germany)
This Day and Age, Cecil B. Demille's now cult-favorite, starring Richard Cromwell and featuring then-teenager: Baby Peggy.
This Is America, the first full-length documentary feature film ever made. 
This Week of Grace directed by Maurice Elvey, starring Gracie Fields – (Britain)
Three-Cornered Moon, starring Claudette Colbert and Richard Arlen
Three Little Pigs, an animated short
Tillie and Gus, starring Alison Skipworth and W. C. Fields
Today We Live, starring Joan Crawford and Gary Cooper
Tonight Is Ours, starring Fredric March and Claudette Colbert
Topaze, starring John Barrymore and Myrna Loy
Torch Singer, starring Claudette Colbert
Tugboat Annie, starring Marie Dressler and Wallace Beery
Turn Back the Clock, starring Lee Tracy and Mae Clarke

V-W
The Vampire Bat, starring Lionel Atwill and Fay Wray
Viktor und Viktoria – (Germany)
Voltaire, starring George Arliss
When Ladies Meet, starring Ann Harding, Robert Montgomery and Myrna Loy
The Wandering Jew, starring Conrad Veidt 
What! No Beer?, starring Buster Keaton
The World Changes, starring Mary Astor and Paul Muni
Wild Boys of the Road, starring Frankie Darro and Edwin Phillips
The Working Man, starring George Arliss and Bette Davis

Y-Z
You Made Me Love You starring Stanley Lupino and Thelma Todd – (GB)
Zero for Conduct (Zéro de conduite), directed by Jean Vigo – (France)

Serials
 Clancy of the Mounted
 Fighting with Kit Carson
 Gordon of Ghost City
 The Mystery Squadron
 The Perils of Pauline, starring Evalyn Knapp
 The Phantom of the Air
 The Return of Chandu
 Tarzan the Fearless, starring Buster Crabbe
 The Three Musketeers, starring Jack Mulhall and John Wayne
 The Whispering Shadow, starring Bela Lugosi
 The Wolf Dog, starring Rin Tin Tin

Comedy film series
 Harold Lloyd (1913–1938)
 Charlie Chaplin (1914–1940)
 Lupino Lane (1915–1939)
 Buster Keaton (1917–1944)
 Laurel and Hardy (1921–1945)
 Dirty Work
 Our Gang (1922–1944)
 Harry Langdon (1924–1936)
 Wheeler and Woolsey (1929–1937)
 Marx Brothers (1929–1946)
 Ted Healy and His Stooges (1933'''–1934)

Animated short film series
 Aesop's Film Fables (1921-1933)
 Krazy Kat (1925–1940)
 Oswald the Lucky Rabbit (1927–1938)
 Mickey Mouse (1928–1953)
 Silly Symphonies Birds in the Spring Father Noah's Ark Three Little Pigs Old King Cole Lullaby Land The Pied Piper The Night Before Christmas Screen Songs (1929–1938)
 Looney Tunes (1930–1969)
 Flip the Frog (1930-1933)
 Terrytoons (1930–1964)
 Merrie Melodies (1931–1969)
 Scrappy (1931–1941)
 Tom and Jerry (Van Beuren) (1931-1933)
 Betty Boop (1932–1939)
 Betty Boop's Ker-Choo Betty Boop's Crazy Inventions Is My Palm Read? Betty Boop's Penthouse Snow White Betty Boop's Birthday Party Betty Boop's May Party Betty Boop's Big Boss Mother Goose Land Popeye the Sailor The Old Man of the Mountain I Heard Morning, Noon and Night Betty Boop's Hallowe'en Party Parade of the Wooden Soldiers Popeye the Sailor (1933–1957)
 Pooch the Pup (1932-1933)
 Willie Whopper (1933–1934)
 ComiColor Cartoons (1933–1936)
 Cubby Bear (1933–1934)
 The Little King (1933–1934)

Births
January 6 – Mark Forest, American actor and bodybuilder (d. 2022)
 January 8 – Jean-Marie Straub, French director (d. 2006)
 January 9
Ken Barrie, English voice actor and singer (d. 2016)
Ann Firbank, actress
 January 12 – Liliana Cavani, Italian director
 January 18 – John Boorman, English director
 January 23 – Chita Rivera, American actress, dancer and singer
 January 28 – Jack Hill, American director and screenwriter
 February 2 – Tony Jay, English-American actor, voice actor and singer (d. 2006)
 February 3 – Polde Bibič, Slovenian film and stage actor and memoir writer (d. 2012)
 February 9 – Ronnie Claire Edwards, American actress (d. 2016)
 February 12 – Costa-Gavras, Greek-French director, screenwriter and producer
 February 13
Caroline Blakiston, English actress
Patrick Godfrey, English actor
Kim Novak, American actress
 February 14 – Madhubala, Indian actress (d. 1969)
 February 18
Yoko Ono, Japanese multimedia artist, singer and songwriter
Željko Senečić, Croatian film, television production designer (d. 2018)
Mary Ure, Scottish actress (d. 1975)
 March 2 – Ziva Rodann, Israeli-American actress and mime artist
 March 3
John Dair, Scottish actor (d. 2005)
Tomas Milian, Cuban actor and singer (d. 2017)
 March 7 - Donald Douglas (Scottish actor), Scottish actor
 March 12 – Barbara Feldon, American actress
 March 13 - Gloria McMillan, American actress (d. 2022)
 March 14 – Michael Caine, English actor
 March 19
Renée Taylor, American actress, screenwriter, playwright, producer and director
Richard Williams, Canadian-British animator (d. 2019)
 March 22 – Richard Easton, Canadian actor (d. 2019)
 March 23 – Laura Soveral, Portuguese actress (d. 2018)
 March 24 - William Smith (actor), American actor (d. 2021)
 April 2 - Joseph Rigano, American character actor (d. 2014)
 April 5 – Frank Gorshin, American actor and comedian (d. 2005)
 April 9 – Jean-Paul Belmondo, French actor (d. 2021)
 April 14 – Shani Wallis, British actress and singer
 April 15 – Elizabeth Montgomery, American actress (d. 1995)
 April 16 – Ric Mancini, American actor (d. 2006)
 April 19 – Jayne Mansfield, American actress (d. 1967)
 April 20 – George R. Robertson, Canadian actor (d. 2023)
 April 22 – Mark Damon, American actor and producer
 April 26 – Carol Burnett, American actress, television host and comedian
 April 29 – Willie Nelson, American musician and actor
 May 10 – Francoise Fabian, French actress
 May 20 – Constance Towers, American actress and singer
 May 21 – Richard Libertini, American actor (d. 2016)
 May 23 – Joan Collins, English actress
 May 28 - Zelda Rubinstein, American actress (d. 2010)
 June 1 - Antony Ponzini, American actor (d. 2002)
 June 8 - Joan Rivers, American comedian, actress, producer, writer and television host (d. 2014)
 June 9 - Mario Donatone, Italian actor (d. 2020)
 June 11 – Gene Wilder, American actor (d. 2016)
 June 20
Danny Aiello, American actor (d. 2019)
Brett Halsey, American actor
 June 21 – Bernie Kopell, American character actor
 July 6 - Sajjad Kishwar, Pakistani actor (d. 2022)
 July 12 - Max Julien, American actor (d. 2022)
 July 13 - Theresa Amayo, Brazilian actress (d. 2022)
 July 24 – John Aniston, Greek-born American actor (d. 2022)
 July 25 - Ken Swofford, American actor (d. 2018)
 July 26
Kathryn Hays, American actress (d. 2022)
Chino 'Fats' Williams, American actor (d. 2000)
 July 29
Lou Albano, Italian-born American professional wrestler and actor (d. 2009)
Robert Fuller (actor), American retired actor
 August 1 – Dom DeLuise, American actor and comedian (d. 2009)
 August 2 – Tom Bell, English actor (d. 2006)
 August 10 - Lynn Cohen, American actress (d. 2020)
 August 16 – Julie Newmar, American actress, dancer and singer
 August 18 – Roman Polanski, Polish director
 August 19 – Debra Paget, American actress and entertainer
 August 21 – Barry Norman, English critic (d. 2017)
 August 25 – Tom Skerritt, American actor
 August 28 – Philip French, English critic (d. 2015)
 September 4 – Richard S. Castellano, American actor (d. 1988)
 September 14 - Zoe Caldwell, Australian-born actress (d. 2020)
 September 15 - Henry Darrow, American character actor (d. 2021)
 September 17 – Pat Crowley, American actress
 September 18 
Robert Blake, American actor (d. 2023)
Fred Willard, American actor (d. 2020)
 September 19 – David McCallum, British-American actor and musician
 September 28 – Robert Hogan, American actor (d. 2021)
 September 29
Franca Parisi, Italian actress
James Villiers, English character actor (d. 1998)
 September 30
Ben Cooper, American actor (d. 2020)
Barbara Knox, English actress
 October 24
J. J. Johnston, American actor and writer (d. 2022)
Enzo Robutti, Italian actor, voice actor, comedian, playwright and writer (d. 2022)
 October 25 - Peter Dennis, English actor (d. 2009)
 November 3 – Jeremy Brett, English actor (d. 1995)
 November 9 - Louise Troy, American actress (d. 1994)
 November 17 – Terry, American performing Cairn Terrier (d. 1945)
 November 19 - Larry King, American television and radio host (d. 2021)
 November 21 - J. Don Ferguson, American character actor (d. 2008)
 November 25 – Kathryn Crosby, American actress
 November 28 – Hope Lange, American actress (d. 2003)
 November 30 – Warren Munson, American actor
 December 3 - Rosalind Knight, English actress (d. 2020)
 December 4 – Wink Martindale, American radio personality, game show host and producer
 December 8 - Ana Ofelia Murguía, Mexican actress
 December 10 - Mako (actor), Japanese-American actor (d. 2006)
 December 13 – Lou Adler, American producer
 December 15 – Tim Conway, American actor and comedian (d. 2019)

Deaths
 January 3 – Jack Pickford, Canadian-born American actor and director (born 1896)
 January 25 – Lewis J. Selznick, Ukrainian-born American producer (born 1870)
 February 15 – Pat Sullivan, Australian-born American director/producer of animated films, alleged co-creator of Felix the Cat (born 1885/87)
 February 23 – David Horsley, English-born American film executive (born 1873)
 February 26 – Spottiswoode Aitken, American actor (born 1868)
 March 8 – Alan Roscoe, American actor (born 1886)
 March 23 – Francine Mussey, French actress (born 1897)
 May 15 – Ernest Torrence, Scottish actor (born 1878)
 June 18 – Harry Sweet, American actor and director (born 1901)
 June 29 – Roscoe Arbuckle, American actor (born 1887)
 June 30 – Georg Blomstedt, Swedish actor (born 1872)
 August 18 – James Williamson, Scottish film developer and film director (born 1855)
 August 28 – Helen Dunbar, American actress (born 1863)
September 23 – Sime Silverman, 60, American newspaper publisher, founder of Variety
 September 24 – Ferdinand Bonn, German actor (born 1861) 
 October 5 – Renée Adorée, French actress (born 1898)
 October 30 – Svend Kornbeck, Danish actor (born 1869)
 December 19 – Jimmie Adams, American comedian (born 1888)

Film debuts
 Morris Ankrum – Reunion in Vienna Dame Peggy Ashcroft – The Wandering Jew Fred Astaire – Dancing Lady Lucille Ball – The Bowery Billy Barty – Gold Diggers of 1933 Frances Drake – The Jewel Nelson Eddy – Broadway to Hollywood Errol Flynn – In the Wake of the Bounty Betty Furness – Lucky Devils Margaret Hamilton – Another Language Phil Harris – Melody Cruise Will Hay – Know Your Apples King Kong
 Dorothy Lamour – Footlight Parade Ralph Richardson – The Ghoul Cesar Romero – The Shadow Laughs Margaret Sullavan – Only Yesterday Claire Trevor – Life in the Raw Orson Welles – Twelfth Night''

References

 
Film by year